Shokhino is a rural locality (a village) in Lyakhovskoye Rural Settlement, Melenkovsky District, Vladimir Oblast, Russia. The population was 29 as of 2010. There are 2 streets.

Geography 
Shokhino is located on the Urvanovskoye Lake, 40 km northeast of Melenki (the district's administrative centre) by road. Urvanovo is the nearest rural locality.

References 

Rural localities in Melenkovsky District